Rohrberg is a municipality in the Schwaz district in the Austrian state of Tyrol.

Geography
Rohrberg lies in the Ziller valley with scattered settlements on the steep surrounding slopes.

References

Cities and towns in Schwaz District